"Who's Real" is a song by American hip hop recording artist Jadakiss, released June 16, 2009 as the fourth single from his third studio album The Last Kiss. The song features guest appearances from fellow American rappers OJ Da Juiceman and Swizz Beatz, the latter of whom produced the track.

Background
The original version had a longer second verse: after Juiceman's lines follow the lines by Jusmula (beginning with "It's real funny when a nigga play a C.L.,/ O.S.E., I be trippin' like G.L." and so on). It also contained the word "bastards" in Jada's line "Couple of flips and then stash it, bastards", which got blocked out in the final version, so it would be totally without profanities.

Music video
A music video was directed by Taj and shot on May 13, 2009. There are cameo appearances from Ja Rule, Clipse, Clyde Carson, DJ Webstar, Grafh, and Styles P. There are also various Ruff Ryders Lifestyles members with their motorbikes featured in the video. The music video was released as the “New Joint of the Day” on 106 & Park on June 10, 2009.

Remix
On June 9, 2009, American rapper DMX's verse from the remix leaked onto the internet. The whole remix was released on June 10. It features Jadakiss’ fellow D-Block cohorts Sheek Louch and Styles P, along with Eve, Drag-On, DMX and Swizz Beatz. Dubbed the “Ruff Ryders remix”, it sparked a long-awaited unification of the Ruff Ryder Entertainment.

In media
The single's instrumental was used for a Powerade commercial, and for the Wake Up Calls on the Rickey Smiley Morning Show.

Charts

References

2009 singles
Jadakiss songs
Swizz Beatz songs
Song recordings produced by Swizz Beatz
Songs written by Swizz Beatz
OJ da Juiceman songs
Songs written by Jadakiss
Roc-A-Fella Records singles
Ruff Ryders Entertainment singles
Def Jam Recordings singles